Sergey Nikolaevich Morgunov (30 November 1918 — 19 July 1946) was one of the top Soviet fighter pilots in World War II, having a tally of 41 solo shootdowns for which he eventually received the title Hero of the Soviet Union in 1946. He was killed in a plane crash shortly afterward.

References 

1918 births
1946 deaths
Soviet World War II flying aces
Heroes of the Soviet Union
Recipients of the Order of Lenin
Recipients of the Order of the Red Banner
Aviators killed in aviation accidents or incidents